Yigo, Guam (pronounced ) is the northernmost village of the United States territory of Guam, and is the location of Andersen Air Force Base. The municipality of Yigo is the largest village on the island in terms of area. It contains a number of populated places, including Asatdas and Agafo Gumas.

History 

The origin of the name "Yigo" is contested. Some state that it is derived from the Spanish word yugo, meaning "yoke". However, some sources refer to the area as Asyigo, meaning "the home of the person Yigo." Any record of such a person has been lost.

Before contact with Europeans, Yigo had a large number of villages. Latte stone structure remnants around Mount Santa Rosa and Mataguac indicate significant populations. During the Spanish-Chamorro Wars of the late seventeenth century, settlements in Yigo included Hanom, Tarague, Hinapsan, and Upi (now Northwest Field). Hanom, in particular, was a critical refuge because of its freshwater spring. The August 1679 defeat of the CHamorus at Hanom by a force of Spaniards and their allies from Nisihan led by José de Quiroga y Losada was one of the fiercest battles of the conflict. Following the subjugation of the CHamoru, the much reduced population was relocated to six villages centered on churches in the center and south of the island. Northern areas, including Yigo, were open to hunters and fishermen but not settlement.

In the early nineteenth century, wealthy residents of Hagåtña began purchasing fertile land in Yigo for agricultural uses. The area became known for producing cocoa beans, used to make hot chocolate for Hagåtña residents, as well as coffee, avocado, citrus, and copra. Upi was an important center of cattle ranching, while copra plantations were located along the northern coast, in particular. Following the Spanish–American War and beginning of the American administration, some CHamorus began to permanently settle in the north. The first elementary school in the area opened in 1912 and, in 1919, the U.S. administration authorized 25-year land use permits in Yigo. Our Lady of Lourdes Chapel was constructed in 1920; previously, Yigo residents journeyed to Hagåtña for mass. The first village store was started in 1925. However, by 1940, Yigo remained sparsely population with about 40 families.

During the Japanese occupation of Guam from 1941 to 1944, some Hagåtña residents moved to Yigo to get away from the occupying Japanese force. The village was the site of a concentration camp during Japanese occupation of the island. The final battle between Japanese and American forces during the Battle of Guam occurred in Yigo on August 7 and 8, 1944, resulting in the destruction of the chapel and many homes. The South Pacific Memorial Peace Park was built by the Japanese Government and is dedicated to the many Japanese and American soldiers who died in the battle of Guam.

Following the war, the population of Yigo soared, first as it accommodated displaced persons from the south and then non-CHamorus who moved to Guam. The economy reoriented from agriculture towards the presence of Andersen Air Force Base and the population continued to grow with the construction of housing subdivisions throughout the village.

Education 

Yigo, served by the Guam Department of Education, has several kindergarten through 5th grade elementary schools:

 Daniel L. Perez Elementary School (formerly Yigo Elementary School)
 Machananao Elementary School
 Upi Elementary School
 F.B. Leon Guerrero Middle School, formerly an elementary school until 1981, when it was converted into a middle school, and Simon Sanchez High School are in Yigo. Sanchez opened as a junior high school in 1974; the school became a high school in 1982 to serve north-eastern Guam.
Simon Sanchez became a high school in 1982.  The first graduating class graduated in May 1983.

Government

Demographics 

The U.S. Census Bureau has the municipality in multiple census-designated places: 
Andersen Air Force Base,
Anao,
Chaguian,
Mataguac,
North Gayinero, and 
South Gayinero.

See also 
 Villages of Guam

References

Further reading 
 Rogers, Robert F. (1995). Destiny's Landfall: A History of Guam. University of Hawai'i Press. .

External links
 Yigo Guam at Guam Portal
 Yigo Map from PDN
 PDN Village Maps